Black Souls is a 2014 Italian-French crime drama film directed by Francesco Munzi. It was nominated for the Golden Lion at the 71st Venice International Film Festival. It was also selected to be screened in the Contemporary World Cinema section at the 2014 Toronto International Film Festival.

Plot
Luigi is a member of the Calabrian 'Ndrangheta and an international drug dealer, linked to powerful South American crime groups. His elder brother Rocco lives in Milan with his wife Valeria and their daughter. He does not approve of the lifestyle of his younger brother but is an entrepreneur thanks to his brother's illicit money. Luciano, the eldest of the three brothers, has remained in Calabria tending his goats in the mountains, with the illusory goal of remaining uninvolved with his brothers' illegal businesses.

Leo, the young and rancorous son of Luciano, in response to an insult, shoots up the exterior of a bar protected by a rival clan of 'Ndrangheta who are already offended by Luigi's refusal to trade with them. Luigi dislikes them because their boss killed his father many years before. The rival clan demands that Luigi supply them with drugs but this motivates Luigi to return to his hometown to take them on, initially by strengthening his links with other families. However, before concluding anything, Luigi is murdered on the street. Rocco, arriving from Milan, is determined to take revenge but, before acting, he wants to know if his family is alone or can count on the support of the other families.

Leo, with a strong attachment to his deceased uncle Luigi, feels that his duty is to solve things alone. He plans to kill the enemy boss but is betrayed by his accomplice and killed. This upsets everyone, especially his father Luciano who, after burning photos of his father who died years before in an ambush by the rival clan, returns home, kills his younger brother Rocco and contemplates a suicide that would complete the extermination of all the men of his family.

Cast
 Barbora Bobuľová as Valeria, Rocco's wife
 Fabrizio Ferracane as Luciano
 Anna Ferruzzo as Antonia, Luciano's wife
 Giuseppe Fumo as Leo, Luciano's son
 Marco Leonardi as Luigi
 Peppino Mazzotta as Rocco

Awards

References

External links
 

2014 films
2014 crime drama films
Italian crime drama films
Vertigo Films films
French crime drama films
2010s Italian-language films
Films about the 'Ndrangheta
2010s French films